The following people are named Rosenhan:

David Rosenhan, a psychologist
Beata Rosenhane, feminist
Schering Rosenhane, a former Governor of Stockholm
Sophia Rosenhane, collector
Also:
Rosenhan experiment, a noted experiment conducted by David Rosenhan